Events in the year 2023 in Ghana.

Incumbents

Events 
Ongoing — COVID-19 pandemic in Ghana

 August – 2023 African Games scheduled to be held in Accra.

Sports 

 2022–23 Ghana Premier League

Deaths 

 February 17: Peter Nanfuri, 80, police officer, inspector general of police (1996–2001).

See also 

African Continental Free Trade Area
COVID-19 pandemic in Africa

References 

 
2020s in Ghana
Years of the 21st century in Ghana
Ghana
Ghana
2023 in Ghanaian sport